Sepia angulata is a species of cuttlefish native to the southeastern Atlantic Ocean, from Bloubergstrand to Still Bay. It is known
only from cuttlebones. The validity of S. angulata has been questioned.

Cuttlebones of this species are up to 75 mm in length.

The type specimen was collected near Bloubergstrand, South Africa and is deposited at the South African Museum.

References

External links

Cuttlefish
Molluscs described in 1972